Lamara Douicher (born March 10, 1980) is an Algerian former footballer who played for USM Blida in the Algerian Ligue Professionnelle 2.

Honours
 Won the Algerian Cup with JS Kabylie in 2011
 Won the Algerian league three times with JS Kabylie in 2004, 2006 and 2008
 Won the CAF Cup three times JS Kabylie in 2000,2001 and 2002

External links
 JS Kabylie Profile
 DZFoot Profile

1980 births
Living people
Footballers from Tizi Ouzou
Kabyle people
Algerian footballers
JS Kabylie players
Algerian Ligue Professionnelle 1 players
AS Khroub players
USM Blida players
Association football midfielders
21st-century Algerian people